Haralds is a Latvian given name, a variant of Harold. It may refer to: 
Haralds Blaus (1885–1945), Latvian sports shooter 
Haralds Kārlis (born 1991), Latvian professional Basketball player
Haralds Mednis (1906–2000), Latvian conductor
Haralds Ritenbergs (born 1932), Latvian ballet dancer and teacher
Haralds Silovs,  Latvian long track and short track speed skater
Haralds Vasiļjevs, Latvian ice hockey coach
Haralds Šlēgelmilhs, known internationally as Harald Schlegelmilch (born 1987), Latvian racing driver.

See also
Harald (disambiguation)
Harold (disambiguation)

Latvian masculine given names